"Find the Real" is a song recorded and performed by hard rock band Alter Bridge. The song was the second of three singles released off of the band's debut studio album, One Day Remains. It became their second top-ten hit, peaking at number seven on the Billboard Mainstream Rock Tracks chart.

Track listing
US radio promo single
 "Find the Real" (radio edit)
 "Find the Real" (album version)

Other media
 "Find the Real" was used as the official theme to 2005 WWE Royal Rumble. That year, the band performed an acoustic version of this song on an episode of WWE Raw during a backstage segment with Edge until they were interrupted by Todd Grisham who was about to interview Edge.

Chart performance

References

2005 singles
Alter Bridge songs
Songs written by Mark Tremonti
Songs written by Myles Kennedy
2004 songs
Songs written by Brian Marshall
Songs written by Scott Phillips (musician)